Edward Patrick Newman (born September 10, 1968) is a former American football wide receiver in the National Football League who played for the New Orleans Saints and Cleveland Browns. He played college football for the Utah State Aggies.

References

1968 births
Living people
American football wide receivers
American football return specialists
New Orleans Saints players
Cleveland Browns players
Utah State Aggies football players